Arcane Legends is a free-to-play hack and slash multiplayer mobile game originally launched in 2012 by Spacetime Studios for Microsoft Windows, iOS, Android and Google Chrome. It is the fourth title in Spacetime Studios' "Legends" series, after Pocket Legends, Star Legends and Dark Legends.

Gameplay
The players can select a class from three possible choices: Warrior, Rogue, or Mage. The player then chooses from three possible starting pets: Precious, Timber, or Guapo.  Warrior has the most health and armor, Rogue's defenses are lower, but has a higher attack and dexterity, while Mage has the most mana, and supports other classes. Each class has a unique set of weapons they can use. They can be purchased with Gold in the Auction, platinum in Store or found in chests that are dropped by enemies. The players can change outfits (vanities) that they find during the adventures or through the auction house.

Pets increase the stats and unleash arcane abilities. They can be found inside of eggs dropped by mobs, chests, or purchased through the store with the in-game currency.  There are three modes to engage in battle with other players: Team Death Match, Capture the Flag and Free for All.

Reception

The game received generally positive reception around the time of its initial launch in 2012. The game starts players with armor, and some boots. As of April 2022, Arcane Legends has a rating of 4.2 stars on the Apple App Store. The game has 968 total reviews.

References

External links

Android (operating system) games
iOS games
Windows games
Google Chrome games
2012 video games
Video games developed in the United States